Count of Faro (in Portuguese Conde de Faro) was a Portuguese title of nobility granted by royal decree issued on 22 May 1469, by King Afonso V of Portugal, to D. Afonso of Braganza, the third son of  Fernando I, Duke of Braganza.

This title refers to the town of Faro do Alentejo and not to the city of Faro, capital of the Algarve. The main estates of this family were located in the Alentejo, especially around the town of Vimieiro.

List of the Counts of Odemira (1469)
 Afonso of Braganza (c.1435- ? ), he married Maria de Noronha, 2nd. Countess of Odemira;
 Estêvão of Faro (c.1550-1629), their great-grandson;
 Dinis of Faro (c.1570-1633), his son;
 Joana Juliana Maria Máxima of Faro (c.1610- ? ), her daughter, married twice but had no issue.

See also 
 Count of Odemira
 List of countships in Portugal

External links
 Genealogy of the Counts of Faro, in Portuguese

Bibliography
"Nobreza de Portugal e Brasil" Vol II, pages 65/68. Published by Zairol, Lda., Lisbon, 1989.

Faro
1469 establishments in Portugal